Isobe is the name of

 Asaichi Isobe (1905–1937), Lieutenant of the Imperial Japanese Army
 Eriko Isobe (born 1977), Japanese volleyball player
 Kōichi Isobe (born 1958), Lieutenant General of the Japan Ground Self-Defense Force
 Koichi Isobe (born 1974), Japanese baseball player
 Sata Isobe (1944–2016), Japanese volleyball player
 Tsutomu Isobe (born 1950), Japanese actor and voice actor

Isobe may refer to

 Isobe, Mie, town in the former Shima District, Mie Prefecture, Japan
 7187 Isobe, main-belt-asteroid named after Syuzo Isobe

See also

 Isobe Station (disambiguation)